Main Aisa Hi Hoon is a Hindi-language drama film released in 2005. It was directed by Harry Baweja and stars Ajay Devgn, Sushmita Sen, Esha Deol and Anupam Kher. This film is a remake of the American drama film I Am Sam written and directed by Jessie Nelson, and starring Sean Penn as a father with a developmental disability.

Synopsis
Indraneel "Neel" Mohan Thakur (Ajay Devgn), a man who has autism, works as a waiter in a coffee shop while he raises his daughter Gungun (Rucha Vaidya) as a single parent. Gungun loves him very much and in an attempt to remain at his level, refuses to go to school.

Gungun's mother Maya Trivedi (Esha Deol) came into Neel's life when she needed someone desperately. After giving birth to her she disappeared never to be seen again. For seven years Neel has looked after the child and both are happy together. However Maya's father Dayanath Trivedi (Anupam Kher) comes to India for his granddaughter.

On Gungun's birthday, Neel has a surprise party for her. Gungun is upset and leaves. Taking advantage of Gungun leaving her house, Dayanath gives Neel a court notice and soon takes Neel to court. With the help of the townspeople Neel is introduced to Niti Khanna (Sushmita Sen), a lawyer and single mother dealing with her own problems. Her son, Rahul, won't listen to her. Niti initially doesn't agree to represent Neel, but when Rahul meets Neel and becomes his friend, Niti realized that she should help him. A custody battle ensues. It is found out that Maya was on drugs and died because of it which is why she didn't return to her father or Neel. When the case is nearing completion and Dayanath's has almost won, Niti decides to marry Neel. After a fifteen minutes recess Niti presents the marriage papers to the judge, and the latter declares that Gungun will be in custody of Neel and Niti, Gungun accepts Niti as her mother and Rahul as her brother. Dayanath regrets being mean to Neel and accepts him as his son-in-law before flying back to London.

Cast 
 Ajay Devgn as Indraneel "Neel" Mohan Thakur
 Sushmita Sen as Advocate Niti Vikram Chahal / Advocate Niti Khanna / Advocate Niti Indraneel Thakur
 Esha Deol as Maya D. Trivedi / Maya I. Thakur, Neel's wife
 Anupam Kher as Dayanath Trivedi
 Vikram Gokhale as Dayanath's Advocate
 Rucha Vaidya as Gungun Thakur, Neel's daughter
 Aanjjan Srivastav as Divesh Mathur
 Lillete Dubey as Ritu Chatterjee
 Naresh Suri as Judge
 Raj Gokani as Rahul Khanna, Niti's son

Soundtrack 

Music is by Himesh Reshammiya and lyrics were written by Sameer.

References

External links
 
 Main Aisa Hi Hoon at IndiaFM.com

2005 films
Indian remakes of American films
2000s Hindi-language films
2005 drama films
Indian drama films
Films about disability in India
Films scored by Himesh Reshammiya
Films directed by Harry Baweja
Indian legal drama films
Films set in Shimla
Indian courtroom films
Developmental disabilities
T-Series (company) films
Hindi-language drama films